Australian Woman's Sphere was a monthly journal published by Vida Goldstein which advocated for women's suffrage in Victoria. The title of the magazine was an objection to the traditional view that a woman's sphere is her home. Because Goldstein supported the idea that a woman's sphere is the world. 

The journal was first published in Melbourne, Victoria, in September 1900. Its last issue numbered 46 appeared on 15 June 1904.

References

External links
 Scanned copy of all editions of Australian Woman's Sphere at the State Library of New South Wales

1900 establishments in Australia
1904 establishments in Australia
Defunct magazines published in Australia
Feminism in Australia
Feminist magazines
Magazines established in 1900
Magazines disestablished in 1904
Magazines published in Melbourne
Women's magazines published in Australia
Women's suffrage in Australia